Pachypasa limosa is a moth of the  family Lasiocampidae. It is found in southern France, the Iberian Peninsula and North Africa.

The wingspan is 20–23 mm. Adults are on wing from June to July.

Recorded food plants include Cupressus and Juniperus species.

Sources 
 P.C.-Rougeot, P. Viette (1978). Guide des papillons nocturnes d'Europe et d'Afrique du Nord. Delachaux et Niestlé (Lausanne).

External links
Lepiforum.de

Lasiocampidae
Moths of Europe
Moths described in 1827